Battle of Makwanpur was fought on 20 January 1763 in Makwanpurgadhi, Gorkha Kingdom between the Gorkhas and the Nawab of Bengal. The Muslims fled Makwanpur, resulted in Gorkhali victory, and the first victory of Gorkhas against overseas soldiers.

References 

Gurkhas
Makwanpur
Makwanpur
1763 in Nepal
History of Bagmati Province